= Farbod =

Persian name

- Gender: Male

Origin
- Origin: Persian
- Meaning: Protector of the glory
- Region of origin: Iran (Persia)

Other names
- Related names: Farzin, Farzad, Farshad, Farshid

Farbod (Persian: فربد) is a Persian name which means "the protector of glory". The name dates back to before the Muslim conquest of Persia when the Persian Empire embraced its ancient religion, Zoroastrianism.

== Etymology ==
The name Farbod is commonly interpreted as a compound of Persian far or farr (فر), meaning “glory” or “splendor”, and bod/bad (بد), described in Persian name dictionaries as a suffix meaning “protector” or “guardian”. The first element is related to the Iranian concept of farr or xwarrah, traditionally associated with glory, splendor, luminosity, fortune, and kingly majesty. The second element is comparable to its use in titles such as spāhbed/sepāhbad, a Sasanian military title meaning “chief of an army” or “general”. The name is therefore often rendered as “protector of glory” or “guardian of splendor”.
